Staaten is a rural locality in the Shire of Mareeba, Queensland, Australia.

Geography
The Staaten River rises in the locality and flows to the west. The Staaten River National Park is in the south-west corner of the locality.

References 

Shire of Mareeba
Localities in Queensland